Winchester is a small town in northeast Drew County, Arkansas, United States. The population was 167 at the 2010 census, declining from its 20th-century high of 279 in 1980.

Geography
Winchester is a town located at  (33.772854, -91.476597).

According to the United States Census Bureau, the town has a total area of 0.5 mi2 (1.3 km), all land.

Demographics

As of the census of 2000, there were 191 people, 69 households, and 52 families residing in the city.  The population density was 147.5/km (383.6/mi2).  There were 78 housing units at an average density of 60.2/km (156.7/mi2).  The racial makeup of the town was 29.32% White, 64.92% Black or African American, 1.05% Native American, 3.66% from other races, and 1.05% from two or more races.  3.66% of the population were Hispanic or Latino of any race.

There were 69 households, out of which 37.7% had children under the age of 18 living with them, 53.6% were married couples living together, 20.3% had a female householder with no husband present, and 23.2% were non-families. 23.2% of all households were made up of individuals, and 13.0% had someone living alone who was 65 years of age or older.  The average household size was 2.77 and the average family size was 3.25.

In the city the population was spread out, with 31.9% under the age of 18, 6.3% from 18 to 24, 24.6% from 25 to 44, 23.6% from 45 to 64, and 13.6% who were 65 years of age or older.  The median age was 36 years. For every 100 females, there were 96.9 males.  For every 100 females age 18 and over, there were 91.2 males.

The median income for a household in the city was $24,375, and the median income for a family was $29,750. Males had a median income of $29,583 versus $11,250 for females. The per capita income for the city was $10,397.  About 12.8% of families and 17.0% of the population were below the poverty line, including 27.8% of those under the age of eighteen and 28.0% of those 65 or over.

Education
It is in the Dumas School District, which operates Dumas High School.

Gallery

References

Towns in Drew County, Arkansas
Towns in Arkansas